This is a list of places in Scotland called Papa or similar, which are so named after the Papar, monks from the Early Historic Period or from their connection to other, later priests.

Orkney

Islands
 Papa Stronsay
 Papa Westray (also known as "Papay")
 Holm of Papay
John of Fordun in his 14th century enumeration of these islands, has a Papeay tertia ("third Papey"), the location of which is unknown.

Placenames
 Paplay, South Ronaldsay
 Paplay, Holm, Mainland
 Papdale, an early name for Kirkwall

Papleyhouse on Eday and Steevens of Papay on North Ronaldsay may not be genuinely related to the Papar.

Shetland
 Papa, Shetland, one of the Scalloway Islands, lying north west of Burra and east of Oxna
 West Head of Papa, a tidal island off Papa, Shetland
 Papa Little
 Papa Stour (Great Papa)
 Sound of Papa, a strait between Papa Stour and the Sandness peninsula.

Hebrides
Gaelic, Pabaigh, anglicised to "Pabay" or "Pabbay" means "priest island", but it is not clear if these names refer to the early Papar or later, post-Norse priests.
 Pabay, off the island of Skye. 
Pabbay near Barra lying in the Bishop's Isles
Pabbay near Harris
Pabbay, South Uist at

See also
Papey - an Icelandic island named after the Papar.

Notes

References
 
 Thomson, William P. L. (2008) The New History of Orkney. Edinburgh. Birlinn. 

Scottish Island set index articles